Sinheung station may refer to these railway stations in South Korea:

 Sinheung station (Daejeon Metro), on Daejeon Metro Line 1
 Sinheung station (Seongnam), on Seoul Subway Line 8

See also
 Sinhung station, a railway station in Sinhŭng County, North Korea